Unification Party may refer to:

 Communist Unification Party, a political party in Spain
 Democratic Unification Party, a political party in Honduras
 Liberia Unification Party, a political party in Liberia
 Party of Communist Unification in the Canaries, a communist political party working for the political autonomy of the Canary Islands
 Revolutionary Party of Democratic Unification, a political party in El Salvador founded in 1957
 Workers' Party of Marxist Unification, a Spanish communist political party formed during the Second Republic